Periklis Pierrakos-Mavromichalis (1863–1938), also known as Mavromichalis-Pierrakos, was a Greek military officer and politician.

Biography
He was the son of general Antonios Mavromichalis, of the famed Maniot Pierrakos (Mavromichalis) clan. He became an officer in the Hellenic Army, fighting in the Greco-Turkish War of 1897, the Balkan Wars, World War I (as Lt Colonel) and later in the Asia Minor Campaign, reaching the rank of Lt General. After retirement, he entered politics, serving as Interior Minister in 1922–1923 and Minister for Military Affairs in 1924. He was subsequently elected into the Greek Senate in 1929. When asked why he had the surname Pierrakos and used Mavromichalis as a nickname, he replied; because he wanted to keep the heritage of his forefathers who fought and die in order for him to live, and the most famous of his forefathers was Petros Mavromichalis (whose real name was Petros Pierrakos).

Periklis Pierrakos-Mavromichalis also competed at the 1896 Summer Olympics in Athens.

Pierrakos-Mavromichalis won the bronze medal in the amateur foil event.  In the preliminary round, he went 2-1 in his group.  He lost to Henri Callot, the eventual silver medallist, but defeated Henri Delaborde and Ioannis Poulos to finish second in the group.  There was no match between him and Athanasios Vouros, who had placed second in the other group; Pierrakos-Mavromichalis was awarded third place because his record of 2-1 in matches was better than Vouros's 1-1.

References

External links

1863 births
1938 deaths
Fencers at the 1896 Summer Olympics
19th-century sportsmen
Greek male fencers
Periklis
Olympic fencers of Greece
Olympic bronze medalists for Greece
People from Laconia
Hellenic Army lieutenant generals
Greek people of the Balkan Wars
Ministers of Military Affairs of Greece
Olympic medalists in fencing
Ministers of the Interior of Greece
Members of the Greek Senate 1929–1932
Medalists at the 1896 Summer Olympics